Osiecznica may refer to the following villages in Poland:
Osiecznica, Lower Silesian Voivodeship (south-west Poland)
Osiecznica, Lubusz Voivodeship (west Poland)